The Cairngorm Mountain Railway, which opened in 2001, is the highest railway in the United Kingdom. The two-kilometre long funicular ascends the northern slopes of Cairn Gorm, the United Kingdom's seventh-highest mountain, serving the Cairngorm Mountain ski resort. The route and ski area are located within the Cairngorms National Park, the largest National Nature Reserve in Britain, located near Aviemore in the Highland area of Scotland.
It is a Doppelmayr 120-SSB funicular railway.

It is owned by the Highlands and Islands Enterprise and was operated by Cairngorm Mountain Limited until July 2014, when Natural Retreats UK took over the lease. Since 2018, it has been run by Cairngorm Mountain (Scotland) Limited.

The railway closed in October 2018 due to structural issues and reopened in January 2023.

History

Construction 
Construction of the Cairngorm Mountain Railway started in 1999 and it opened on 24 December 2001 (forty years after the opening of the White Lady Chairlift, which it replaced). The construction was initiated because the chairlift was too sensitive to the strong winds in the area. The maximum operating speed is  during the ski season and  the rest of the year. At these speeds, the trip takes about four minutes in winter and nine minutes during the summer (calculated without middle station stops). The single track line has a passing loop just above the middle station. During ascent, the maximum gradient is 23° (1 in 2.5, or 40-percent inclination). The railway starts at the Base Station in the Coire Cas area, where there is a restaurant, shop, ticket office, hire shop, rangers' office and Disability Sport UK office. The Scottish Ski Club has a building close to the middle station.

At peak times there can be 150,000–160,000 non-winter sports visitors, combined with a further 50,000–120,000 annual sports visitors during the winter. CML can expect to cater to 1,000 visitors per day in the summer months.

Most of the route is single track, with a short passing loop near half way. Up to 120 standing passengers can be carried in each of the system's two carriages. The train is fully accessible for wheelchair users and both the Base Station and Ptarmigan Station have lift access to all levels.

The funicular railway operates by 'hauling' up one carriage using electric motors to pull the haul rope as the other carriage descends at the same time. The system is powered by two stationary in series 500 kW electric motors, a gear box and a 'soft start-soft stop' control system which can increase the electrical frequency and vary the current and voltage to control the carriage speeds as they approach or leave a station. A hydraulically operated 'counter' rope is connected to both carriages to maintain haul rope tension. The two carriages are permanently connected by the haul rope and the counter rope and can never operate independently.

The funicular railway system is normally operated from a manned control room within the Ptarmigan building, but can also be operated from the Base station control room or from each railway carriage. There are dedicated sophisticated computer control, instrumentation, communication and safety systems for the railway which have a range of back up systems and there are also standby generators and manual back up systems for moving the carriages.

During the ski season, skiers are asked to stay within the designated ski area  and climbers and hill walkers are not allowed to use the railway to travel uphill. The railway operators have agreed, in conjunction with Scottish Natural Heritage (SNH), to operate a formal visitor management plan to protect fragile areas of the mountain environment. This means that for conservation reasons, the public is not allowed to access the mountains during the summer season from Ptarmigan building. However, walkers who have climbed the hill themselves may purchase a downhill ticket at the Ptarmigan building for travelling back down to Base. There are no middle station stops or exits during the summer.

On 29 November 2018, it was announced that the railway had been placed into administration. Blair Milne, one of the administrators, cited that the company had become "unsustainably loss-making" after an extended closure in October 2018. Natural Retreats, the previous owners since 2013, released a press statement saying the firm still had "potential". That hope did not come to fruition and the company owed £2m.

Closure 
The closure of the Cairngorm Mountain Railway funicular was "due to health and safety concerns", or "structural problems" according to reports in summer 2019. At the time, an engineering investigation was still underway to determine whether modifications would be "achievable and affordable", according to its then-owner, the Scottish government's Highlands and Islands Enterprise which also owns Cairngorm Mountain ski centre. The final findings of the consultants, SE Group, were released in July 2019, but a decision on how to proceed had not yet been made at that time.

Reinstatement 
On 14 October 2020, the Scottish Government announced more than £16m would be spent on the reinstatement of the funicular railway as part of a £20m project. The programme of engineering works commenced in early November 2020. The works were completed late in 2022 and the railway resumed on 26 January 2023.

See also 
 List of funicular railways

References

External links 

 
 Photos
 Cairngorms Park Info

 

Mountain railways
Funicular railways in the United Kingdom
Rail transport in Scotland
Transport in Highland (council area)
Companies owned by municipalities of Scotland
Railway lines opened in 2001
2000 mm gauge railways in Scotland
2001 establishments in Scotland
Cairngorms